, known professionally as , is a Japanese actress of half French descent.

Biography
Minami was born in Tokyo, Japan on 22 September 1986. She is internationally known for her role as Shogo Kawada's girlfriend Keiko Onuki in the critically acclaimed Japanese film Battle Royale.

Career
She was previously employed under Horipro, a giant Japanese model and talent agency. She acted in the 2006 Japanese drama film Humoresque: Sakasama no Chou (literally Humoresque: The Upside Down Butterfly).

She has acted in films including Toso Kuso Tawake, Lament of the Lamb, Robo Rock and Detroit Metal City, and Yukan Club. She also starred in the Hanazakari No Kimitachi E special, in which she portrays a character named Julia.

Modeling
Minami is a regular print model for Japanese fashion magazines, as well as appearing in other magazines such as mina, SEDA, Phat Photo, Dolce Vita and 26ans. She is also a regular model for Shiseido Majolica Majorica, and often appears on their website. She also has featured on many advertisements for both Shisheido and Lotte Pione.

Filmography

Films
 2000 Battle Royale (バトルロワイアル) as Onuki Keiko
 2002 Yumeko's Nightmare (惨劇館 夢子) as Okuyo Yumeko
 2003 Embraced by Mana (マナに抱かれて) as Emi
 2004 Problem Free Us (問題のない私たち) as Shiozaki Maria
 2005 Tomie: Revenge (富江 REVENGE) as Fuyugi Yukiko
 2006 Humoresque: Sakasama no Chou (ユモレスク 〜逆さまの蝶〜) as Sonny
 2007 Sakuran (さくらん) as Wakagiku
 2007 Tōbō Kuso Tawake (逃亡くそたわけ) as Hanachan
 2007 Robo☆Rock (Robo☆Rock) as Kiriko
 2008 Detroit Metal City (デトロイト・メタル・シティ) as Nina
 2010 Vengeance Can Wait (乱暴と待機) as Nanase
 2012 Afro Tanaka (アフロ田中) as Sacchan
 2015 Her Granddaughter 
 2018 Vision as Hana
 2019 Tezuka's Barbara
 2020 Minamata as Aileen
 2023 Rohan au Louvre as Emma Noguchi

Television series
 2004 Cheer Heaven (天国への応援歌 チアーズ〜チアリーディングにかけた青春〜) as Tamura Miho
 2007 Getsuyou Golden (月曜ゴールデン)
 2007 Operation Mystery Second File (怪奇大作戦 セカンドファイル) as Ogawa Saori
 2007 Yūkan Club as Kenbishi Yuri
 2008 Loss Time Life (ロス:タイム:ライフ) as Yoshida Yukari
 2008 Save the Future・Boku no shima/Kanojo no Sango (Save the Future・僕の島/彼女のサンゴ) as Inoue Shiori
 2009 Hanazakari no Kimitachi e as Julia Maxwell
 2009 OL Nippon (OLにっぽん) as Yabe Sakura
 2009 The Quiz Show (ザ・クイズショウ) as Mika
 2010 Trick Shinsaku Special 2 (Trick 新作スペシャル 2) as Sasaki Kikushi
 2011 Banquet of the Lower Class (下流の宴) as Miyagi Tamao
 2011 Human Metamorphosis as Tomura Toshiko
 2011 Yujo Mameshiba (幼獣マメシバー) as Kitajo Yoshiki
 2012 Person of Destiny (運命の人) as Jahana Michi
 2022 First Love

References

External links

 
 

Japanese people of French descent
1986 births
Living people
Japanese female models
Japanese film actresses
Japanese television actresses
Actresses from Tokyo
21st-century Japanese actresses
Japanese editors
Japanese women editors